Remaja Islam Sunda Kelapa, is an Islamic youth organization located in Jakarta, Indonesia. It was founded in 1974.

Since it was founded, RISKA has been a dynamic Islamic youth organization where youngsters who come to RISKA not only learn Islam but also can explore their hobbies in art, sport, journalism, etc. To accommodate the creativity of its members, RISKA often held a local of even international activities - the event are varied from sport, music, photography, youth community meeting, Ramadhan social activities etc.

Departments
The Departments in RISKA are:
ART
AAR - Adik Asuh RISKA
BMAQ - Belajar Mahir Al-Quran
DKR - Departemen Kajian RISKA
Cinematography
SC - Sister Club
Volaris - Vocal Class Riska
RISCUE
SDIS - Studi Dasar Islam Siswa
SDTNI - Studi Dasar Terpadu Nilai Islam

Further reading
 Saliwangi, Basennang.(no date) Remaja Islam Sunda Kelapa [microform] : suatu studi mengenai usaha pengembangan generasi muda / Basennang Saliwangi. Washington, D.C. : Library of Congress, Photoduplication. 2 microfiches. Library catalogue summary: On the Remaja Islam Sunda Kelapa, an Islamic youth organization in Jakarta: its programs and activities dealing with the development of the younger generation in Indonesia.
Notes:	Microform reproduction. Originally published: Jakarta : Pusat Latihan Penelitian Ilmu Ilmu Sosial, Fakultas Ilmu Ilmu Sosial, Universitas Indonesia, 1980-1981. Microfiche 87/50388.

External links
 RISKA Official Website
List of other youth organisations

Islamic youth organizations
Youth organizations established in 1974
Youth organizations based in Indonesia